Katharina Marie Schubert (born January 22, 1977) is a German actress.

Schubert grew up in Braunschweig and studied acting at the Max Reinhardt Seminar in Vienna. Still during her studies she debuted at the Wiener Festwochen in a play by Botho Strauß. She subsequently became part of the ensemble of the Burgtheater in Vienna.

From 2001 until 2008 Schubert belonged to the ensemble of the Münchner Kammerspiele starring in various roles under the direction of Andreas Kriegenburg, Stefan Pucher, Johan Simons, René Pollesch, Alvis Hermanis or Thomas Ostermeier. With Anton Chekhov's play Three Sisters and Shakespeare's The Tempest, she was invited to the Berliner Theatertreffen which showcases the most important theatre productions from the German speaking world. 
Since 2010 Schubert is part of the ensemble of the Deutsches Theater Berlin.

Apart from working in theatre Schubert starred in various productions for television and film. For her portrayal of an unemployed actress in Oliver Haffners comedy drama  she received the Bayerischer Filmpreis as Best Actress in 2015 as well as a nomination as Best Actress for the Deutscher Filmpreis.

Her own two short films Wabosch Wilma (2009) and Another fucking... (2011) both premiered at the Hof International Film Festival.

In 2011 Schubert was a jury member at the Montreal World Film Festival.

References

German film actresses
German television actresses
1977 births
Living people
Actors from Braunschweig